is a Japanese baseball player who currently plays for the Hokkaido Nippon-Ham Fighters of Nippon Professional Baseball's (NPB) Pacific League as a First Baseman. He was the first pick of the Fighters in the 2017 draft. He is the son of notable Japanese rugby union coach, Katsuyuki Kiyomiya.

Early career
Kiyomiya drew major news attention since the 2012 Little League World Series, where at the age of 13 he employed an 80 mph fastball (major league equivalent of throwing 104 MPH) to lead Team Japan to a 12-2 LLWS championship win over Goodlettsville (TN). He was also noted to have hit 60 home runs in 50 games    Kiyomiya then went to Waseda Jitsugyo High School where he set the Japanese High School Baseball record for home runs with 111 home runs over three seasons in high school. On August 23, 2017, it was announced that he will serve as captain of Samurai Japan for the 2017 U-18 Baseball World Cup.

Professional career

Hokkaido Nippon-Ham Fighters
Seven teams chose Kotaro in the first round of the 2017 NPB draft, the Hokkaido Nippon-Ham Fighters won the right to negotiate with Kiyomiya by winning the lottery. Kotaro then chose the jersey number 21.

On February 27, 2019, he was selected for Japan national baseball team at the 2019 exhibition games against Mexico, but on March 4, 2019, he canceled his participation due to broken right hamate bone.

References

External links

1999 births
Living people
Japanese baseball players
Hokkaido Nippon-Ham Fighters players
Nippon Professional Baseball first basemen
Nippon Professional Baseball outfielders
Baseball people from Tokyo